Giffey is an English surname. Notable people with the surname include:

Brian Giffey (1887–1967), British intelligence operative
Franziska Giffey (born 1978), German politician
Niels Giffey (born 1991), German basketball player

See also
Giffen

English-language surnames